A county council is the highest governing body of a county municipality (fylkeskommune) in Norway. The county council sets the scope of the county municipal activity. The council is led by the Chairman of the County Council, more commonly called a County Mayor (fylkesordfører). Members of the council are elected for a four-year term through the general local elections. It is common for members of a county council to also hold seats in municipal councils, but very rare that they also hold legislative (Storting) or other government office, without a leave of absence.

History
The county council has its roots in Amtsformandskabet created in 1837. Starting in 1964, members of the county councils were appointed by the municipal councils. In 1975, the first general elections were held for the county councils.

County administration of Norway
1837 establishments in Norway
County councils